The 1924–25 NHL season was the eighth season of the National Hockey League. The NHL added two teams this season, a second team in Montreal, the Montreal Maroons and the first U.S. team, the Boston Bruins. Six teams each played 30 games.

The NHL regular-season champion Hamilton Tigers did not participate in the playoffs, as their players demanded to their owner, Percy Thompson, that they would not participate in the NHL championship series unless they received an additional $200 each for the extra six games played that year. Under their contracts, the Tigers players were to receive the same amount of money no matter how many games they played from December 1, 1924, to March 31, 1925 (even though the season started on November 29, 1924). NHL President Frank Calder was not amused, stating that the players would be fined or suspended if they did not play in the final series, but the players stated that they would rather retire than advantage be taken of them. The day of the final game of the Semi-Final, Tiger Shorty Green met with Calder to try to reach an agreement, but to no avail. The players were all suspended and fined $200 each, therefore eliminating themselves from the playoffs.

Because of the suspension, the semi-final playoff series between Montreal and Toronto became the NHL championship series. The Montreal Canadiens won the series and faced off against the Victoria Cougars of the Western Canada Hockey League (WCHL) for the Stanley Cup. Victoria won the series, the last non-NHL team to win the Cup.

League business
Prior to the start of this hockey season, the Pacific Coast Hockey Association folded and two of its teams, the Vancouver Maroons and Victoria Cougars, joined the Western Canada Hockey League. This meant that after three seasons of having three leagues compete for the Stanley Cup, there were once again only two.

At the November 1924 NHL meeting, the NHL approved two new franchises, including its first franchise in the United States of America. Charles Adams of Boston was granted a franchise. The NHL also granted a second franchise for Montreal to James Strachan and Donat Raymond. Applications from New York City, Pittsburgh and Philadelphia were shelved.

A new trophy was added for the 1924–25 NHL season. The original Lady Byng Trophy was donated by Lady Byng, wife of Governor General Viscount Byng of Vimy, to be handed out to the player who showed the best sportsmanship and gentlemanly conduct combined with performance in play. She presented it to Frank Nighbor of the Ottawa Senators.

Regular season
This was the first season for the Montreal Maroons and Boston Bruins, the Bruins becoming the first American NHL team. It was also the last season for the Hamilton Tigers, which would dissolve at season's end. The number of games played per team was increased from 24 to 30.

The first game the League ever played on United States soil was the first game for the Bruins, who hosted the Maroons on December 1, 1924.

A new arena, the Montreal Forum, was built to house the Maroons. However, the Montreal Canadiens played in it first. Because the Canadiens' home rink, Mount Royal Arena, couldn't produce ice, the November 29th home opener against the Toronto St. Patricks was moved to the Forum. The Canadiens beat the St. Patricks 7–1, before 9,000 fans. A NHL attendance record of 11,000 was set on December 27, when the Maroons hosted the Canadiens.

The Maroons actually had no official nickname their first season. However, fans took to the deep crimson uniforms they wore and called them the Maroons, and the team leaned on two former Ottawa Senators, Punch Broadbent and Clint Benedict they picked up from Ottawa before the season but still managed only fifth place. Broadbent scored a pair of goals in the Maroons' first ever victory, a 3–1 victory over Ottawa at the Forum in Montreal. Broadbent scored five goals in a game on January 7 as Montreal defeated the Tigers 6–2 in the Abso-Pure rink in Hamilton.

On December 17, goaltenders Jake Forbes of Hamilton and Alex Connell of Ottawa engaged in the first ever scoreless tie in a regular season game in NHL history.

Just before the end of the season, the Bruins, which finished in last place, had a modest winning streak. First, they beat the Montreal Canadiens 3–2 March 3. Normand Shay scored the winning goal on a two on one break at 16:39 of the third period as Jimmy Herbert shot and then Shay pounced on the rebound and put it by Georges Vezina. The game was rough and referee Jerry Laflamme meted out quite a few penalties, including four minors to Lionel Hitchman of Boston. Howie Morenz starred in a losing cause with two goals. The Bruins then defeated the league-leading Hamilton Tigers 2–0 in their next game as Doc Stewart played well in goal.

Final standings

Playoffs

With an increase in the number of NHL teams, the NHL changed its playoff format by having the second and third place teams play a two-game total goals series to see who played the number one seed for the NHL championship. The NHL champion would go on to play the winner of the Western Canada Hockey League for the Stanley Cup. As it happened, the Tigers, the first-place team went on strike, and the winner of the series between the second and third place teams, Montreal, became the NHL champion and played for the Cup. This marked the last time until 2020 that the playoffs were played entirely in Canada.

NHL Championship
The third seed Montreal Canadiens played against the second seed Toronto St. Patricks in a total goals series. The winner of that series was to go on and play the first seed team, the Hamilton Tigers. But it was not to happen that way. During the total goals series, the Hamilton players demanded $200 each for the extra six games played during the regular season and the league threatened to suspend the players and the team. Last-ditch efforts to reach a compromise failed and the Tigers were suspended. It was suggested that the Ottawa Senators be included in the playoffs, but Charlie Querrie and Leo Dandurand cited a fourth-place finish didn't qualify Ottawa a playoff berth and it was decided that Montreal and Toronto played for the league title. NHL president Frank Calder announced that the Canadiens played home games at the Forum, but Leo Dandurand said that they would be played at Mount Royal Arena unless it were necessary to move to the Forum, citing home games were home games, and the Canadiens played better in front of their own fans. Calder backed down from his stand. Montreal won the series against Toronto and earned the right to play for the Stanley Cup.

Stanley Cup Finals

In the Western Canada Hockey League, the third place Victoria Cougars won its league championship faced the Montreal Canadiens for the Stanley Cup. The series was played in Patrick Arena in Victoria, except for game two, which was played at Denman Arena in Vancouver to gather greater fan support and more income. Victoria beat Montreal three games to one, out-scoring the Canadiens 16 to 8. Victoria was the first (and only to date) non-NHL team to win the Stanley Cup since the NHL's founding.

NHL Playoff scoring leader
Note: GP = Games played; G = Goals; A = Assists; Pts = Points

Awards
The NHL introduced its second individual award, the Lady Byng Trophy, named after its donor, Lady Byng, wife of Canada's Governor-General. It is awarded to Frank Nighbor for excellence, gentlemanly play and sportsmanship.

Note: The Prince of Wales Trophy was not in use during this season. The Canadiens were engraved onto the Trophy in 1925–26.

Player statistics

Scoring leaders
Note: GP = Games played; G = Goals; A = Assists; Pts = Points

Source: NHL.

Leading goaltenders
GP = Games Played, GA = Goals Against, SO = Shutouts, GAA = Goals Against Average

Coaches
Boston Bruins: Art Ross
Hamilton Tigers: Jimmy Gardner
Montreal Canadiens: Leo Dandurand
Montreal Maroons: Cecil Hart and Eddie Gerard
Ottawa Senators: Pete Green
Toronto St. Patricks: Eddie Powers

Debuts
The following is a list of players of note who played their first NHL game in 1924–25 (listed with their first team, asterisk(*) marks debut in playoffs):

Alex Connell, Ottawa Senators
Carson Cooper, Boston Bruins
Hap Day, Toronto St. Patricks
Charles Dinsmore, Montreal Maroons
Jimmy Herbert, Boston Bruins
Bert McCaffrey, Toronto St. Patricks
Alex Smith, Ottawa Senators
Hooley Smith, Ottawa Senators

Last games
The following is a list of players of note that played their last game in the NHL in 1924–25 (listed with their last team):

Free agency

Transactions

See also
List of Stanley Cup champions
1924–25 WCHL season

References

 
 
 
 
 

Notes

External links
Hockey Database
NHL.com

 
NHL
NHL